Tagkawayan, officially the Municipality of Tagkawayan,  is a 1st class municipality in the province of Quezon, Philippines. According to the 2020 census, it has a population of 54,003 people.

It is the easternmost town of Quezon, bordered to the east by the province of Camarines Norte and to the south by Camarines Sur in the Bicol Region.

History
After the rise in population with the potential of an economic growth, a formal petition to convert barrio Tagcawayan into an independent municipality was launched. The said letter was sent to President Manuel L. Quezon through Tomas Morato. Antonio Lagdameo then laid out an "urbanization plan" was laid out for the proposed municipality.

On December 31, 1940, the barrios of Aloneros, Bagong Silang, Balogo, Cabibihan, Catimo, Danlagan, Kabugwang, Kandalapdap, Malbog, Monato, Mangayaw, Quinatacutan, Siguiwan, Tagcawayan, and Triumfo, then part of the municipality of Guinayangan, were separated and constituted into a new and separate municipality known as Tagkawayan, by virtue of Executive Order No. 316. The change took effect on the next day. 

On March 7, 1941, the Guinayangan sitios of Aliji, Bamban, Bukal, Danlagan, Batis, Del Rosario, Manatong Ilaya, Manatong Munti, Malupot, San Luis, San Roque Manato, Santo Niño, and portions of Tuba part of the province of Tayabas were annexed to the municipality by virtue of Executive Order No. 330. On January 1, 1948, the barrio of Aloneros was returned to Guinayangan by virtue of Executive Order No. 78 signed on August 12, 1947.

Geography

Barangays

Climate

Demographics

Economy

Transportation

By Land 
The municipality is connected to Metro Manila by the Quirino Highway, and daily rail services to and from Naga and Legazpi to the southeast are provided by Philippine National Railways.

To spur development in the municipality, the Toll Regulatory Board designated Toll Road 5 as the extension of South Luzon Expressway. A 420-kilometer, four-lane expressway starting from the terminal point of the now under construction SLEX Toll Road 4 in Barangay Mayao, Lucena City to Matnog, Sorsogon, near the Matnog Ferry Terminal. On August 25, 2020, San Miguel Corporation announced that it will invest in the project, which will reduce travel time from Lucena to Matnog from 9 hours to 5.5 hours.

Another expressway that will serve Tagkawayan is the Quezon-Bicol Expressway (QuBEx), which will link Lucena and San Fernando, Camarines Sur.

Notable personalities
 Gen. Guillermo Eleazar – Chief of Philippine National Police, 2021

References

External links
Tagkawayan Profile at PhilAtlas.com
[ Philippine Standard Geographic Code]
Philippine Census Information
Local Governance Performance Management System
Unofficial Site of the Municipality of Tagkawayan, Quezon

Municipalities of Quezon
Establishments by Philippine executive order